Electoral district of Mulgrave may refer to:

 Electoral district of Mulgrave (Queensland), an electoral district of the Legislative Assembly of Queensland
 Electoral district of Mulgrave (Victoria), an electoral district of the Victorian Legislative Assembly